Ocostaspora is a genus of fungi in the family Halosphaeriaceae.

References

Microascales
Sordariomycetes genera